Millgrove Township is one of twelve townships in Steuben County, Indiana, United States. As of the 2010 census, its population was 1,577 and it contained 990 housing units.

History
Fawn River State Fish Hatchery was listed on the National Register of Historic Places in 1997.

Geography
Lakes in this township include Bell Lake, Brown Lake, Chair Factory Lake, Lake Gage, Lake Syl-van, Lime Lake, Lime Lake, Perch Lake, Rhodes Lake, Sally Owen Lake, Tamarack Lake and Warner Lake. The stream of Crooked Creek runs through this township.

Cities and towns
 Orland

Unincorporated towns
 Panama at 
(This list is based on USGS data and may include former settlements.)

Cemeteries
The township contains three cemeteries: Carlton, Greenlawn and Mill Grove.

Major highways
  Interstate 80
  Indiana State Road 120
  Indiana State Road 327

References
 U.S. Board on Geographic Names (GNIS)
 United States Census Bureau cartographic boundary files

External links
 Indiana Township Association
 United Township Association of Indiana

Townships in Steuben County, Indiana
Townships in Indiana